Olyra may refer to:

 Olyra (fish), a genus of catfishes
 Olyra (plant), a genus of Bambusoideae
 Olyra (moth), a genus of moths that was replaced by Euwallengrenia